Branislav Borenović (born 4 March 1974) is a Bosnian Serb politician who is the current President of the Party of Democratic Progress. He has also been a member of the House of Representatives since 6 December 2018.

He was also a member of the National Assembly of Republika Srpska from 2010 until 2018, and was the first Minister of Family, Youth and Sports of Republika Srpska from 28 February 2006 to 30 November 2006 as well.

Personal life
Branislav has been married to Biljana Borenović since 1998, and together they have three sons. They live in Banja Luka. On 19 October 2020, it was confirmed that Borenović tested positive for COVID-19, amid its pandemic in Bosnia and Herzegovina.

References

External links

Branislav Borenović at JavnaRasprava.ba

1974 births
Living people
People from Sanski Most
Serbs of Bosnia and Herzegovina
Academic staff of the University of Banja Luka
Politicians of Republika Srpska
Party of Democratic Progress politicians
Members of the House of Representatives (Bosnia and Herzegovina)